Platanos (Greek: Πλάτανος meaning plane tree) is a village and a former municipality in Aetolia-Acarnania, West Greece, Greece. Since the 2011 local government reform it is part of the municipality Nafpaktia, of which it is a municipal unit. The municipal unit has an area of 169.678 km2. Population 1,611 (2011). The population of the village was 207 in 2011 and the population of the municipal district, which includes the village Kato Platanos, was 253. The river Evinos is situated east of the town.

Geography
The municipal unit Platanos is subdivided into the following communities (constituent villages in brackets):
Platanos (Platanos, Kato Platanos)
Agios Dimitrios
Arachova (Arachova, Kranes)
Achladokastro
Dendrochori (uninhabited)
Kastanea
Klepa
Livadaki
Neochori Nafpaktias (Neochori, Petroto)
Perdikovrysi
Perista
Chomori (Chomori, Agia Triada)

Historical population

References

External links
Municipality of Platanos 
Platanos (municipality) on GTP Travel Pages (in English and Greek)
Platanos (village) on GTP Travel Pages (in English and Greek)
Oiniades on culture.gr
Chomori Village (municipality of Platanos) (in English and Greek)

Populated places in Aetolia-Acarnania
Nafpaktia